The 1998–99 A Group was the 51st season of the A Football Group, the top Bulgarian professional league for association football clubs, since its establishment in 1948.

Overview 
It was contested by 16 teams, and Litex Lovech won the championship.

League standings

Results

Champions
Litex Lovech

Ignatov, Kirilov, Balabanov, Sarbakov, Bogdanović and Stoynev left the club during a season.

Top scorers

Source:1998–99 Top Goalscorers

References

External links
Bulgaria - List of final tables (RSSSF)

First Professional Football League (Bulgaria) seasons
Bulgaria
1